McCarthy's Bar is the best selling book by travel writer and comedian Pete McCarthy. First published in 2000, the book sold nearly a million copies leading to McCarthy winning Newcomer of the Year at the British Book Awards in 2002.

The book is often titled McCarthy's Bar: A Journey of Discovery in Ireland.

Plot summary
The book describes a series of trips McCarthy makes to Ireland in the late 1990s exploring his past and family history, as well as documenting how Ireland is coping with changing realities.

Publication
Its front cover features MacCarthy's Bar.

References

1998 non-fiction books
British travel books
English non-fiction books